Canopy Cliffs are steep cliffs extending from Mount Allsup to Mount Ropar on the southeast side of Peletier Plateau, Queen Elizabeth Range. The descriptive name was applied by the Northern Party of the New Zealand Geological Survey Antarctic Expedition (1961–62), suggesting the precipitous nature of the cliffs.

References
 

Cliffs of Oates Land